The Fuerste House is a historic building located in Guttenberg, Iowa, United States.  The two-story brick structure was built about 1870 in the vernacular Greek Revival style.  The screened-in porch on the west side was enclosed at some point.  Mrs. L. Fuerst operated a millinery shop on the first floor of the family residence by at least 1891.  The Fuerst family operated a machine shop across the street.  The building was individually listed on the National Register of Historic Places in 1984.  In 2004 it was included as a contributing property in the Front Street (River Park Drive) Historic District.

References

Houses completed in 1870
Vernacular architecture in Iowa
Houses in Guttenberg, Iowa
Houses on the National Register of Historic Places in Iowa
National Register of Historic Places in Clayton County, Iowa
Individually listed contributing properties to historic districts on the National Register in Iowa